The Raven coal mine is a proposed mining project in British Columbia undergoing a joint federal/provincial review. It involves Compliance Energy Corp (a small Canadian mining company) and partners Itochu Corporation (Japan) and LG International (Korea). It is also known as the “Comox Join Venture”. 

It involves 31 square kilometres underground on Vancouver Island between Beaufort Mountains and Baynes Sound and 2 km2 surface works 4.2 km southwest of Buckley Bay in upper Cowie Creek.

The Environmental Impact Assessment was deemed inadequate, and a new proposal is being worked on.

References

Coal mines in Canada